The Scotland national under-21 rugby union team was one of several junior national rugby union teams behind the Scottish national side.

It has now been disbanded and replaced by the under-20 side.

The Under 21 side that faced Ireland Under 21 in the 2004-05 Six Nations Championship:
 Brian Archibald (Stirling County)
 Ben Addison (Stirling County)
 Nick De Luca (Heriot's)
 Garry Law (Hawick)
 Steven Manning (Ayr)
 David Blair (Sale Sharks)
 Alasdhair McFarlane (GHA)
 Ross Ford (The Borders and The Scottish Institute of Sport)
 Stuart Fenwick (Ayr)
 Ian Nimmo (Heriot's)
 Stuart Walker (Newcastle Falcons)
 Colin White (Stirling County)
 Scott Forrest (Glasgow Hawks)
 Neil Cochrane (Watsonians) (Capt)

References

R